In the visual arts, color theory is the body of practical guidance for color mixing and the visual effects of a specific color combination. Color terminology based on the color wheel and its geometry separates colors into primary color, secondary color, and tertiary color. The understanding of color theory dates to antiquity. Aristotle (d. 322 BCE) and Claudius Ptolemy (d. 168 CE) already discussed which and how colors can be produced by mixing other colors. The influence of light on color was investigated and revealed further by al-Kindi (d. 873) and Ibn al-Haytham (d.1039). Ibn Sina (d. 1037), Nasir al-Din al-Tusi (d. 1274), and Robert Grosseteste (d. 1253) discovered that contrary to the teachings of Aristotle, there are multiple color paths to get from black to white. More modern approaches to color theory principles can be found in the writings of Leone Battista Alberti (c. 1435) and the notebooks of Leonardo da Vinci (c. 1490). A formalization of "color theory" began in the 18th century, initially within a partisan controversy over Isaac Newton's theory of color (Opticks, 1704) and the nature of primary colors. From there it developed as an independent artistic tradition with only superficial reference to colorimetry and vision science.

Classifications

Colors can be classified as:

 Warm and cold
 Receding and advancing
 Positive and negative
 Subtractive and additive

Color abstractions 

The foundations of pre-20th-century color theory were built around "pure" or ideal colors, characterized by different sensory experiences rather than attributes of the physical world. This has led to several inaccuracies in traditional color theory principles that are not always remedied in modern formulations.

Another issue has been the tendency to describe color effects holistically or categorically, for example as a contrast between "yellow" and "blue" conceived as generic colors, when most color effects are due to contrasts on three relative attributes which define all colors:

 Value (light vs. dark, or white vs. black),
 Chroma [saturation, purity, strength, intensity] (intense vs. dull), and
 Hue (e.g. the name of the color family: red, yellow, green, cyan, blue, magenta).

The visual impact of "yellow" vs. "blue" hues in visual design depends on the relative lightness and saturation of the hues.

These confusions are partly historical and arose in scientific uncertainty about color perception that was not resolved until the late 19th century when artistic notions were already entrenched. They also arise from the attempt to describe the highly contextual and flexible behavior of color perception in terms of abstract color sensations that can be generated equivalently by any visual media.

Many historical "color theorists" have assumed that three "pure" primary colors can mix into all possible colors, and any failure of specific paints or inks to match this ideal performance is due to the impurity or imperfection of the colorants. In reality, only imaginary "primary colors" used in colorimetry can "mix" or quantify all visible (perceptually possible) colors; but to do this, these imaginary primaries are defined as lying outside the range of visible colors; i.e., they cannot be seen. Any three real "primary" colors of light, paint or ink can mix only a limited range of colors, called a gamut, which is always smaller (contains fewer colors) than the full range of colors humans can perceive.

Historical background 

Color theory was originally formulated in terms of three "primary" or "primitive" colors—red, yellow and blue (RYB)—because these colors were believed capable of mixing all other colors.

The RYB primary colors became the foundation of 18th-century theories of color vision, as the fundamental sensory qualities that are blended in the perception of all physical colors, and conversely, in the physical mixture of pigments or dyes. These theories were enhanced by 18th-century investigations of a variety of purely psychological color effects, in particular the contrast between "complementary" or opposing hues that are produced by color afterimages and in the contrasting shadows in colored light. These ideas and many personal color observations were summarized in two founding documents in color theory: the Theory of Colours (1810) by the German poet Johann Wolfgang von Goethe, and The Law of Simultaneous Color Contrast (1839) by the French industrial chemist Michel Eugène Chevreul. Charles Hayter published A New Practical Treatise on the Three Primitive Colours Assumed as a Perfect System of Rudimentary Information (London 1826), in which he described how all colors could be obtained from just three.

Subsequently, German and English scientists established in the late 19th century that color perception is best described in terms of a different set of primary colors—red, green and blue-violet (RGB)—modeled through the additive mixture of three monochromatic lights. Subsequent research anchored these primary colors in the differing responses to light by three types of color receptors or cones in the retina (trichromacy). On this basis the quantitative description of the color mixture or colorimetry developed in the early 20th century, along with a series of increasingly sophisticated models of color space and color perception, such as the opponent process theory.

Across the same period, industrial chemistry radically expanded the color range of lightfast synthetic pigments, allowing for substantially improved saturation in color mixtures of dyes, paints, and inks. It also created the dyes and chemical processes necessary for color photography. As a result, three-color printing became aesthetically and economically feasible in mass printed media, and the artists' color theory was adapted to primary colors most effective in inks or photographic dyes: cyan, magenta, and yellow (CMY). (In printing, dark colors are supplemented by black ink, known as the CMYK system; in both printing and photography, white is provided by the color of the paper.) These CMY primary colors were reconciled with the RGB primaries, and subtractive color mixing with additive color mixing, by defining the CMY primaries as substances that absorbed only one of the retinal primary colors: cyan absorbs only red (−R+G+B), magenta only green (+R−G+B), and yellow only blue-violet (+R+G−B). It is important to add that the CMYK, or process, color printing is meant as an economical way of producing a wide range of colors for printing, but is deficient in reproducing certain colors, notably orange and slightly deficient in reproducing purples. A wider range of colors can be obtained with the addition of other colors to the printing process, such as in Pantone's Hexachrome printing ink system (six colors), among others.

For much of the 19th century artistic color theory either lagged behind scientific understanding or was augmented by science books written for the lay public, in particular Modern Chromatics (1879) by the American physicist Ogden Rood, and early color atlases developed by Albert Munsell (Munsell Book of Color, 1915, see Munsell color system) and Wilhelm Ostwald (Color Atlas, 1919). Major advances were made in the early 20th century by artists teaching or associated with the German Bauhaus, in particular Wassily Kandinsky, Johannes Itten, Faber Birren and Josef Albers, whose writings mix speculation with an empirical or demonstration-based study of color design principles.

Traditional color theory

Complementary colors 

For the mixing of colored light, Isaac Newton's color wheel is often used to describe complementary colors, which are colors that cancel each other's hue to produce an achromatic (white, gray or black) light mixture. Newton offered as a conjecture that colors exactly opposite one another on the hue circle cancel out each other's hue; this concept was demonstrated more thoroughly in the 19th century. An example of complementary colors would be red and green

A key assumption in Newton's hue circle was that the "fiery" or maximum saturated hues are located on the outer circumference of the circle, while achromatic white is at the center. Then the saturation of the mixture of two spectral hues was predicted by the straight line between them; the mixture of three colors was predicted by the "center of gravity" or centroid of three triangle points, and so on.

According to traditional color theory based on subtractive primary colors and the RYB color model, yellow mixed with purple, orange mixed with blue, or red mixed with green produces an equivalent gray and are the painter's complementary colors. These contrasts form the basis of Chevreul's law of color contrast: colors that appear together will be altered as if mixed with the complementary color of the other color. A piece of yellow fabric placed on a blue background will appear tinted orange because orange is the complementary color to blue.

However, when complementary colors are chosen based on the definition by light mixture, they are not the same as the artists' primary colors. This discrepancy becomes important when color theory is applied across media. Digital color management uses a hue circle defined according to additive primary colors (the RGB color model), as the colors in a computer monitor are additive mixtures of light, not subtractive mixtures of paints.

One reason the artist's primary colors work at all is due to the imperfect pigments being used have sloped absorption curves and change color with concentration. A pigment that is pure red at high concentrations can behave more like magenta at low concentrations. This allows it to make purples that would otherwise be impossible. Likewise, a blue that is ultramarine at high concentrations appears cyan at low concentrations, allowing it to be used to mix green. Chromium red pigments can appear orange, and then yellow, as the concentration is reduced. It is even possible to mix very low concentrations of the blue mentioned and the chromium red to get a greenish color. This works much better with oil colors than it does with watercolors and dyes.

The old primaries depend on sloped absorption curves and pigment leakages to work, while newer scientifically derived ones depend solely on controlling the amount of absorption in certain parts of the spectrum.

Another reason the correct primary colors were not used by early artists is they were not available as durable pigments. Modern methods in chemistry were needed to produce them.

Warm vs. cool colors 

The distinction between "warm" and "cool" colors has been important since at least the late 18th century. The difference (as traced by etymologies in the Oxford English Dictionary), seems related to the observed contrast in landscape light, between the "warm" colors associated with daylight or sunset, and the "cool" colors associated with a gray or overcast day. Warm colors are often said to be hues from red through yellow, browns, and tans included; cool colors are often said to be the hues from blue-green through blue violet, most grays included. There is a historical disagreement about the colors that anchor the polarity, but 19th-century sources put the peak contrast between red-orange and greenish-blue.

Color theory has described perceptual and psychological effects to this contrast. Warm colors are said to advance or appear more active in a painting, while cool colors tend to recede; used in interior design or fashion, warm colors are said to arouse or stimulate the viewer, while cool colors calm and relax. Most of these effects, to the extent they are real, can be attributed to the higher saturation and lighter value of warm pigments in contrast to cool pigments; brown is a dark, unsaturated warm color that few people think of as visually active or psychologically arousing.

The traditional warm/cool association of a color is reversed relative to the color temperature of a theoretical radiating black body; the hottest stars radiate blue (cool) light, and the coolest radiate red (warm) light.

This contrast is further seen in the psychological associations of colors with the Doppler effect seen in astronomical objects. Traditional psychological associations, where warm colors are associated with advancing objects and cool colors with receding objects, are directly opposite those seen in astrophysics, where stars or galaxies moving towards our viewpoint on Earth are blueshifted (advancing) and stars or galaxies moving away from Earth are redshifted (receding).

Achromatic colors 

Any color that lacks strong chromatic content is said to be unsaturated, achromatic, near-neutral, or neutral. Near neutrals include browns, tans, pastels, and darker colors. Near neutrals can be of any hue or lightness. Pure achromatic, or neutral colors include black, white and all grays.

Near neutrals are obtained by mixing pure colors with white, black or grey, or by mixing two complementary colors. In color theory, neutral colors are easily modified by adjacent more saturated colors, and they appear to take on the hue complementary to the saturated color; e.g., next to a bright red couch, a gray wall will appear distinctly greenish, this is a property of human vision.

Black and white have long been known to combine "well" with almost any other colors; black decreases the apparent saturation or brightness of colors paired with it and white shows off all hues to equal effect.

Tints and shades 

When mixing colored light (additive color models), the achromatic mixture of spectrally balanced red, green, and blue (RGB) is always white, not gray or black. When we mix colorants, such as the pigments in paint mixtures, a color is produced which is always darker and lower in chroma, or saturation, than the parent colors. This moves the mixed color toward a neutral color—a gray or near-black. Lights are made brighter or dimmer by adjusting their brightness, or energy level; in painting, lightness is adjusted through mixture with white, black, or a color's complement.

It is common among some painters to darken a paint color by adding black paint—producing colors called shades—or lighten a color by adding white—producing colors called tints. However, it is not always the best way for representational painting, as an unfortunate result is for colors to also shift in hue. For instance, darkening a color by adding black can cause colors such as yellows, reds, and oranges, to shift toward the greenish or bluish part of the spectrum. Lightening a color by adding white can cause a shift towards blue when mixed with reds and oranges. Another practice when darkening a color is to use its opposite, or complementary, color (e.g. purplish-red added to yellowish-green) in order to neutralize it without a shift in hue and darken it if the additive color is darker than the parent color. When lightening a color this hue shift can be corrected with the addition of a small amount of an adjacent color to bring the hue of the mixture back in line with the parent color (e.g. adding a small amount of orange to a mixture of red and white will correct the tendency of this mixture to shift slightly towards the blue end of the spectrum).

Split primary system 

In painting and other visual arts, two-dimensional color wheels or three-dimensional color solids are used as tools to teach beginners the essential relationships between colors. The organization of colors in a particular color model depends on the purpose of that model: some models show relationships based on human color perception, whereas others are based on the color mixing properties of a particular medium such as a computer display or set of paints.

The split-primary palette, also called color-bias theory, is a color-wheel model that attempts to explain, and to compensate for, the unsatisfactory results sometimes produced when mixing the traditional primary colors, red, yellow, and blue.

Painters have long considered red, yellow, and blue to be primary colors. In practice, however, many of the mixtures produced from these colors lack chromatic intensity. Rather than adopting a more satisfactory set of primary colors, proponents of split-primary theory explain this lack of chroma by the purported presence of chemical impurities, small amounts of other colors, in the paints, or biases away from the ideal primary toward one or the other of the adjacent colors. Every red paint, for example, is said to be tainted with, or biased toward, either blue or yellow, every blue paint toward either red or green, and every yellow toward either green or orange. These biases are thought to result in mixtures that contain sets of complementary colors, darkening the resulting color. In order to obtain vivid mixed colors, according to split-primary theory, it is necessary to employ the primary colors whose biases both fall in the direction, on the color wheel, of the color to be mixed, combining, for example, green-biased blue with green-biased yellow to make bright green.

Though widely accepted and taught, the split-primary system is based on false assumptions. The perceived bias of colors is not due to chemical impurities. Rather, the color of any given colorant is inherent to its chemical and physical properties, the purity of such a chemical being unrelated to whether it conforms to our arbitrary conception of an ideal hue. Moreover, the identity of gamut-optimizing primary colors is determined by human color vision. Although no set of three primaries can be mixed to obtain the complete color gamut perceived by humans, red, yellow, and blue are a poor choice if high chroma mixtures are desired. From their incorrect premises, proponents of split-primary theory conclude that extra colors are needed in order to mix a wide gamut of high-chroma colors, an idea belied by the longtime success of three-color photographic printing.

Although flawed in principle, the split-primary system can be successful in practice, because the recommended blue-biased red and green-biased blue positions are often filled by near approximations of magenta and cyan, while orange-biased red and violet-biased blue serve as secondary colors, which may widen the gamut even further.

This system is still popular among contemporary painters, as it is basically a simplified version of Newton's geometrical rule that colors closer together on the hue circle will produce more vibrant mixtures. However, with the range of contemporary paints available, many artists simply add more paints to their palette as desired for a variety of practical reasons. For example, they may add a scarlet, purple and/or green paint to expand the mixable gamut; and they include one or more dark colors (especially "earth" colors such as yellow ochre or burnt sienna) simply because they are convenient to have premixed. Printers commonly augment a CMYK palette with spot (trademark specific) ink colors.

Color harmony 

It has been suggested that "Colors seen together to produce a pleasing affective response are said to be in harmony". However, color harmony is a complex notion because human responses to color are both affective and cognitive, involving emotional response and judgment. Hence, our responses to color and the notion of color harmony is open to the influence of a range of different factors. These factors include individual differences (such as age, gender, personal preference, affective state, etc.) as well as cultural, sub-cultural, and socially-based differences which gives rise to conditioning and learned responses about color. In addition, context always has an influence on responses about color and the notion of color harmony, and this concept is also influenced by temporal factors (such as changing trends) and perceptual factors (such as simultaneous contrast) which may impinge on human response to color. The following conceptual model illustrates this 21st-century approach to color harmony:

 

wherein color harmony is a function (f) of the interaction between color/s (Col 1, 2, 3, …, n) and the factors that influence positive aesthetic response to color: individual differences (ID) such as age, gender, personality and affective state; cultural experiences (CE), the prevailing context (CX) which includes setting and ambient lighting; intervening perceptual effects (P) and the effects of time (T) in terms of prevailing social trends.

In addition, given that humans can perceive over 2.8 million different colors, it has been suggested that the number of possible color combinations is virtually infinite thereby implying that predictive color harmony formulae are fundamentally unsound. Despite this, many color theorists have devised formulae, principles or guidelines for color combination with the aim being to predict or specify positive aesthetic response or "color harmony".

Color wheel models have often been used as a basis for color combination principles or guidelines and for defining relationships between colors. Some theorists and artists believe juxtapositions of complementary color will produce strong contrast, a sense of visual tension as well as "color harmony"; while others believe juxtapositions of analogous colors will elicit a positive aesthetic response. Color combination guidelines (or formulas) suggest that colors next to each other on the color wheel model (analogous colors) tend to produce a single-hued or monochromatic color experience and some theorists also refer to these as "simple harmonies".

In addition, split complementary color schemes usually depict a modified complementary pair, with instead of the "true" second color being chosen, a range of analogous hues around it are chosen, i.e. the split complements of red are blue-green and yellow-green. A triadic color scheme adopts any three colors approximately equidistant around a color wheel model. Feisner and Mahnke are among a number of authors who provide color combination guidelines in greater detail.

Color combination formulae and principles may provide some guidance but have limited practical application. This is due to the influence of contextual, perceptual, and temporal factors which will influence how color/s are perceived in any given situation, setting, or context. Such formulae and principles may be useful in fashion, interior and graphic design, but much depends on the tastes, lifestyle, and cultural norms of the viewer or consumer.

As early as the ancient Greek philosophers, many theorists have devised color associations and linked particular connotative meanings to specific colors. However, connotative color associations and color symbolism tends to be culture-bound and may also vary across different contexts and circumstances. For example, red has many different connotative and symbolic meanings from exciting, arousing, sensual, romantic, and feminine; to a symbol of good luck; and also acts as a signal of danger. Such color associations tend to be learned and do not necessarily hold irrespective of individual and cultural differences or contextual, temporal or perceptual factors. It is important to note that while color symbolism and color associations exist, their existence does not provide evidential support for color psychology or claims that color has therapeutic properties.

Monochromatic 
The monochromatic formula chooses only one color (or hue). Variations of the color are created by changing the value and saturation of the color. Since only one hue is used, the color and its variations are guaranteed to work.

Current status 
Color theory has not developed an explicit explanation of how specific media affect color appearance: colors have always been defined in the abstract, and whether the colors were inks or paints, oils or watercolors, transparencies or reflecting prints, computer displays or movie theaters, was not considered especially relevant. Josef Albers investigated the effects of relative contrast and color saturation on the illusion of transparency, but this is an exception to the rule.

See also

References

External links 

 Understanding Color Theory by University of Colorado Boulder - Coursera
 Handprint.com: Color – a comprehensive site about color perception, color psychology, color theory, and color mixing
 Color Differences
 Color Theory in Landscape Design
 The Dimensions of Colour – color theory for artists using digital/ traditional media
 Color Thesaurus World's Largest Database of Color Names
 Stanford University CS 178 interactive Flash demo introducing trichromatic color theory.
 App that generates harmonious color palettes from photos based on color theory
 Color theory as it relates to interior decorating
 Applying Color Theory to Digital Media and Visualization – a book from CRC Press

Color
Color space